A craftwork is an applied form of art,  a social and cultural product reflecting the inclusive nature of folk imagination. 

Craftwork may refer to:
 Handicraft, work where useful and decorative objects are made completely by hand or by using only simple tools
 Kraftwerk, a highly influential German band